Yook Sung-jae (born ), also known mononymously as Sungjae, is a South Korean singer, songwriter, actor, host and entertainer. He is a member of the boy group BtoB and its sub-group, BtoB Blue. Aside from his group's activities, Yook has acted in television dramas Plus Nine Boys (2014), Who Are You: School 2015 (2015), The Village: Achiara's Secret (2015), Guardian: The Lonely and Great God (2016), and Mystic Pop-up Bar (2020) and has appeared in several reality shows, including: Hitmaker, We Got Married, and Master in the House.

Yook released his debut solo album, Yook O'Clock, on March 2, 2020.

Early life and education
Yook was born on May 2, 1995, in Yongin, Gyeonggi Province. He has one older sister. Yook comes from a business family. His father is the CEO of an IT corporation that deals with semiconductors. His grandfather was the first to introduce red carp in South Korea, while his grandmother operated a fishing farm in Paju.

He briefly studied for a month in England and the Philippines, respectively. He completed his high school education at Hanlim Multi Art School, graduating in 2014. He then attended Dongshin University, majoring in Practical Music.

Career

Pre-debut
On August 10, 2010, he participated in the stage performance of "2010 Cube Stars Party".

On March 6, 2011, Yook also participated in the stage performance of "2011 CUBE Stars Party" with bandmate Seo Eunkwang, Im Hyun-sik, Jung Il-hoon, and supposed to be member Lee Min-woo.

Yook entered the JYP 6th Audition Final Round before joining his current agency, Cube Entertainment.

2012–2014: Debut with BtoB and solo activities

Yook made his debut as a vocalist of BtoB with "Insane" and "Imagine" on March 21, 2012. On March 23, 2012, Yook co-host SBS MTV's music program The Show alongside bandmate Lee Min-hyuk.

In 2013, Yook Sungjae started his first ever acting debut in drama Monstar (TV series) as part of the supporting cast alongside his bandmates Lee Min-hyuk, Lee Chang-sub and Im Hyun-sik. Sungjae acted as Arnold, a member of boy idol group 'Men In Black'. He appeared in 4 episodes in total, episodes 2, 6, 9, and 12. He, with BTOB's Lee Minhyuk, Lee Changsub, Im Hyunsik and Beast's Yong Jun-hyung were featured in the drama OST Part 1 titled "Days Gone By", OST Part 2 "After Time Passes", and OST Part 7 "First Love". In the same year, Sungjae and BTOB made a cameo appearance in hit drama The Heirs episode 4 as themselves, an idol group band BTOB.

In 2014, Yook appeared in the television series Reply 1994 as Sungjoon/Ssukssuk, Na-jung's little brother. In July 2014, Yook was cast as a presenter for the program, A Song For You alongside Kangin of Super Junior and Amber of f(x). He also participated in the program Hitmaker season 1, presented by South Korean producer duo Jeong Hyeong-don and Defconn and became part of the program's project unit group, Big Byung, together with Got7's Jackson and VIXX members, N and Hyuk. The group then releases two singles: "Stress Come On" and "Ojingeo Doenjang" (Korean: 오징어 된장). The same year, he received his first main acting role in Plus Nine Boys, playing a 19-year old Judo athlete. He then joined the reality-variety program Real Men from 2014 to 2015.

2015–2017: Acting and rise in popularity

Yook achieved his breakthrough when he landed a leading role in the teen drama Who Are You: School 2015, alongside Kim So-hyun and Nam Joo-hyuk. He also released an OST for the show, "Love Song" with Park Hye-soo. After the series ended, he experienced a rise in popularity and landed several endorsement deals. Yook then starred in the horror mystery series The Village: Achiara's Secret alongside Moon Geun-young in 2015. He received the "New Star award" for his performance in The Village: Achiara's Secret, and won "Best Couple award" with Kim So-hyun for Who Are You: School 2015.

In 2015, Yook joined King of Mask Singer, competing under the alias Tired Bumblebee, and received good feedback for his performance. He was paired up with Red Velvet's Joy in the fourth season of reality show We Got Married. The couple went on to release a duet titled "Young Love", with the pair contributing to the lyric composition of the song with the help of his bandmate BTOB's Im Hyun-sik as the producer. At the 2015 MBC Entertainment Awards, Yook received the "Best Couple award" alongside Joy and the "Best Male Rookie (in Variety) award". The couple departed from We Got Married on May 7, 2016.

In September 2015, Yook became one of the trio main hosts Yook Sungjae-GOT7's Jackson Wang-and actress Kim Yoo-jung of the music-program Inkigayo and left the show in May 2016. In 2016, Sungjae was appointed as an ambassador of the King Sejong Institution. He also became part of BTOB's first sub-unit, BTOB Blue, and debuted in September 2016.

From 2016 to 2017, Yook starred in the hit fantasy-romance drama Guardian: The Lonely and Great God. He also joined the cast for the reality-documentary show Law of the Jungle filmed in Sumatra, Indonesia. In August 2017, he participated in the digital single project, Piece of BtoB. He released the songs "Say It" and "Paradise", the latter having been personally composed and written by himself, on August 30. In late 2017, he joined the cast of the reality show, Master in the House.

On December 29, 2017, Cube Entertainment announced that Yook suffered a back injury and would be receiving treatment at the hospital. He had symptoms of lumbar disc herniation reportedly worsened during the concert 2017 BtoB Time - Our Concert. On January 5, 2018, Yook attended the press conference of Master in the House. This was the first time he appeared after recuperating from a lumbar injury; he gradually resumed his activities after 2 weeks of rest.

2018–present:3x2=6, Yook O'Clock and Mystic Pop-up Bar

In 2018, Yook held his first fan meeting, Paradise at TICC in Taiwan on February 11, Macpherson Stadium in Hong Kong on May 19, and in Manila, Philippines on July 13.

In 2019, during BtoB's seventh anniversary Yook was chosen as their new leader. Cube TV premiered a new reality show, "Lovely 95s" (예쁘장한 구오즈), featuring Yook on July 12. It was revealed that he planned and made his close same-aged 95s friends, former Boyfriend members Youngmin, Kwangmin and Minwoo, Teen Top's Ricky and model Baek Kyung Do to have a variety show.

On December 19, 2019, Cube revealed their plans for a new music project 3x2=6, which aims for Yook to release two songs every month for three months starting December 2019 and release it on various online music sites. Yook associated with the number '6' (pronounced as "yook" in Korean) to his surname 'Yook' (육), showing the wits of only Yook Sung-jae. The project consists of three themes; Singer is to showcase his ability as an artist by releasing his first produced song, Human is his desire to be loved for a long time and BtoB Yook Sung-jae as his bandmates Jung Il-hoon and Peniel Shin participated in the project. The project began on December 26, 2019, with the release of its first single "Yook" (뭍(陸)) and "From Winter" (겨울 속에서) as part of 3x2=6 PArt 1. "Yook" is described as a melodic modern-rock genre song with Yook participating in the lyrics and composing. For 3x2=6 Part 2, Yook showed his reversed charm with "W.A.U" (What About U) and "Chicken". "Chicken" is a song with clever lyrics talking about how as time passes, no matter how much trends change, just like (fried) chicken that is loved by everyone. The song was released on January 16, 2020. The project concluded on February 6, 2020, with the first collaboration song between Yook and Ilhoon "HMHN" and "Hypnotized" which was performed with Peniel at 2018 BtoB Time - This Is Us concert.

After a three-year acting hiatus, Yook made a return to the small-screen as part of the main cast of Mystic Pop-up Bar, a JTBC drama based on a popular webtoon of the same name in early 2020. On February 18, Yook left the cast of Master in the House after two years on the show prior to his mandatory military service. Yook released his debut solo album, Yook O'Clock, on March 2, 2020, which consisted of six songs from 3X2=6 and lead single "Come with the Wind".

Personal life

Mandatory military service 
On May 3, 2020, Yook announced on his Instagram that he is enlisting in mandatory military service on May 11, and was confirmed by Cube. According to MyDaily, Yook will serve as part of the Ministry of National Defense military band after completing his five weeks of basic military training course at Nonsan Training Center. 

On May 7, 2021, Yook and Teen Top's Ricky performed "Love Blossom" (original song from K.Will) at Seoul National Cemetery Spring Contact - Free Periodical Concert as part of their military service duty as a military band. The concert was held with the theme of 'Waiting for the normal daily life before the pandemic'. On June 6, Yook and Major Jeong Dong-mi hosted the 66th Memorial Day Commemoration Ceremony which was held by the Ministry of Patriots and Veterans Affairs (South Korea) in front of the Memorial Tower at the Seoul National Cemetery.

After taking his final military leave in October 2021, Yook announced that he will not return to his unit following the army's protocols regarding the COVID-19 pandemic. He was officially discharged from military service on November 14, 2021.

Philanthropy
In 2015, Yook took part in a fundraiser that auction items to the Social Welfare Community Fund for Love to support low-income children. In December, 2015, SBS revealed that Yook donated ₩3 million to Jeonbuk National University Hospital, which was the filming location of The Village: Achiara's Secret. The same year, he also participated in Briquette Sharing Campaign of the Korean Peninsula and donated briquettes to the people at Kowloon Village in Gangnam-gu, Seoul.

Discography

Extended plays

Singles

Filmography

Television series

Television show

Hosting

Awards and nominations

Notes

References

External links

 
 
 

1995 births
Living people
K-pop singers
Cube Entertainment artists
South Korean dance musicians
South Korean male television actors
South Korean male idols
People from Yongin
Hanlim Multi Art School alumni
BtoB (band) members
Yuk clan
Weekly Idol members
21st-century South Korean male singers